Neighel Drummond Morales (born 2 February 1982) is a Costa Rican football player who, as of 2011 was playing for Puma in the Costa Rican Primera División.

Club career
Drummond made his league debut on 25 May 2003 against Municipal Osa and has played as a goalkeeper for local sides Ramonense, Alajuelense and Cartaginés. In June 2003, Alajuelense player Drummond, who was on loan at Pérez Zeledón, suffered severe facial injuries sustained in a car accident and spent a few days on the intensive care unit.

After he left Saprissa in 2006 the club claimed Brujas owed them 4,000 dollars of transfer money.

In May 2010 he left Ramonense for Cartaginés and in January 2011 Drummond left Cartaginés for UCR.

International career
Drummond played in the 2001 FIFA World Youth Championship held in Argentina.

He was a reserve goalkeeper for Costa Rica's 2004 Olympic football team, who exited in the quarter finals, having finished second in Group D.

References

External links
 Profile - UCR
Biography at Sports-reference.com

1982 births
Living people
Footballers from San José, Costa Rica
Association football goalkeepers
Costa Rican men's footballers
Olympic footballers of Costa Rica
Footballers at the 2004 Summer Olympics
L.D. Alajuelense footballers
Municipal Pérez Zeledón footballers
Deportivo Saprissa players
Brujas FC players
A.D. Carmelita footballers
A.D. Ramonense players
C.S. Cartaginés players
C.F. Universidad de Costa Rica footballers
Liga FPD players